Albert Titley (18 November 1918 – 17 September 1986) was an English footballer who played for West Bromwich Albion, Port Vale, and Macclesfield Town in the 1930s.

Career
Titley played for Leek Alexandra and West Bromwich Albion, before joining Port Vale in May 1934. After making his debut in place of Bob Morton on 24 November; in a 2–1 defeat by Hull City at The Old Recreation Ground, he played the next three Second Division games before being given a free transfer to Macclesfield Town in May 1935, at the end of the 1934–35 season. He missed just one game of the 1935–36 Cheshire County League season, scoring 16 goals.

Career statistics
Source:

References

Footballers from Stoke-on-Trent
English footballers
Association football wingers
West Bromwich Albion F.C. players
Port Vale F.C. players
Macclesfield Town F.C. players
English Football League players
1911 births
1986 deaths